Anthony Eyre (1634-1671) was an English politician who sat in the House of Commons from 1661 to 1671.

Eyre was the only son of Sir Gervase Eyre of Laughton-en-le-Morthen, Yorkshire and his wife Elizabeth Babington, daughter of John Babington of Rampton, Nottinghamshire, and was baptised on 17 September 1634. His father was killed defending Newark Castle for the King in the English Civil War.  Eyre married firstly Lucy Digby, daughter of Sir John Digby of Mansfield Woodhouse, Nottinghamshire on 9 June 1657. She died in June 1659. He married secondly Elizabeth Pakington, daughter of Sir John Pakington, 2nd Baronet, of Westwood, Worcestershire.

Eyre was returned as Member of Parliament for Nottinghamshire at the 1661 general election to the Cavalier Parliament. He held the seat until his death.

Eyre died in 1671. He was succeeded in his estates by his son Gervase Eyre.

References

See also
University of Nottingham Manuscripts and Special Collections Biography of Anthony Eyre (1634-1671)

1634 births
1671 deaths
English MPs 1661–1679
People from the Metropolitan Borough of Rotherham
People from Bassetlaw District